Double Dynamite is a 1951 American musical comedy film directed by Irving Cummings and starring Jane Russell, Groucho Marx, and Frank Sinatra. The film was written by Leo Rosten (story), Melville Shavelson (screenplay), Mannie Manheim (based on a character created by), and Harry Crane (additional dialogue).

The film was originally entitled It's Only Money, before RKO owner Howard Hughes changed the title to Double Dynamite as a reference to co-star Jane Russell's famous breasts.

The movie involves a bank teller (Sinatra) suspected of embezzling who turns to a sardonic waiter (Groucho Marx) for advice.  Although Sinatra has by far the most screen time, he took third billing behind Jane Russell and Groucho Marx. Most of the scenes are devoted to the interactions of Sinatra and Marx, who had just begun televising his radio show You Bet Your Life the year before and was in between his  wilder Marx Brothers persona and the more toned-down television Groucho. Both Sinatra and Jane Russell play against type as a shy, timid pair, while Marx portrays a sarcastic waiter who breezily mentors the frightened young couple.

Jane Russell and Groucho Marx each sing a duet with Frank Sinatra written by Jule Styne and Sammy Cahn.  Marx and Sinatra sing "It's Only Money", and Russell and Sinatra deliver the romantic "Kisses and Tears."

Filmed in 1948, it was held for several years after production, and released in 1951. Despite the star power of Sinatra, Russell, and Groucho Marx, it was not a financial or critical success.

Plot
Meek California Fidelity Trust teller Johnny Dalton asks his boss J. L. McKissack for a raise so he can marry fellow teller Mildred "Mibs" Goodhue. Though Johnny is turned down, Mibs wants to get married anyway. Emile J. Keck, a friend and waiter at an Italian restaurant they frequent, also urges Johnny to take a chance, even facetiously suggesting he rob the bank where he works. When he insists on waiting, Mibs storms out.

While returning to work, Johnny intervenes when he spots two men beating up a third in an alley. The victim, "Hot Horse" Harris, turns out to be a bookie. To show his gratitude, Harris gives a stunned Johnny $1000, but Johnny refuses to accept it. To make it easier, Harris changes it to a "loan", then promptly bets the entire amount on a sure thing in a fixed race, making sure to place the bet at the bookie joint run by his competitor (the one who had him beaten up). From the winnings, Harris takes back the loan, and Johnny is left with $5000. Harris then makes two more bets for Johnny, both winners. Johnny now has won $60,000. Harris has only $40,000 on hand, so he tells Johnny he will send him the rest later. Johnny rushes off to share the good news with Emile, but Emile believes he took his advice about bank robbery.

As it turns out, the bank's auditors have discovered there is $75,000 missing. Fearing he will be suspected of the crime, Johnny enlists Emile's help in hiding the money. When he tells Mibs about his windfall, she does not believe his story either. She finds $20,000, the remainder of what Harris owes Johnny, and goes to see Bob Pulsifer, Jr., the lazy, lecherous son of the bank's founder. She offers it to him on condition that he not inform the police about Johnny, but he telephones them anyway.

Mibs insists on driving Johnny to Mexico, but they are caught. Much to the couple's surprise, the police know that Johnny won the money; instead, they arrest Mibs, as the auditors tracked the $75,000 to her. However, Johnny discovers by accident that Mibs's adding machine is malfunctioning: according to it, 2+2=5 and 3+3=7. Afterward, Mibs tells a man she thinks is a "reporter" about all the expensive gifts Johnny has given her, only to learn that the man actually works for the IRS.

Cast
 Jane Russell as Mildred "Mibs" Goodhue
 Groucho Marx as Emile J. Keck
 Frank Sinatra as Johnny Dalton
 Don McGuire as Bob Pulsifer, Jr.
 Howard Freeman as R. B. Pulsifer, Sr.
 Nestor Paiva as "Hot Horse" Harris
 Frank Orth as Mr. Kofer
 Harry Hayden as J. L. McKissack
 William Edmunds as Mr. Baganucci, Emile's boss
 Russell Thorson as IRS tailman

Production
The film was developed as The Pasadena Story. It was based on a story by Leo Rosten which Michael Curtiz purchased. Curtiz hired Mel Shavelson to write the script. In February 1948 Curtiz sold the story and script to Signet Productions, Irving Cummings' production company. They tried to arrange release through Columbia.

Eventually Signet secured finance with RKO. It was Cummings' first directorial effort since 1944 due to illness. In fact, it would be the last film Cummings directed, in a career that began in 1921. The casting of the three leads went to Jane Russell, under contract to Howard Hughes, who had just bought the studio; Groucho Marx; and Frank Sinatra, who still owed a film to RKO.

Filming started 22 November 1948 at RKO under the title It's Only Money. Filming finished 22 December by which stage it was the last film being shot on the RKO lot. RKO then shut down the entire studio as it re-adjusted following Howard Hughes' purchase of the company. As was often the case with Hughes productions, the film took a number of years to be released.

Reception
Bosley Crowther, the critic for The New York Times, dismissed Double Dynamite, writing, "Whatever that sizzling title is supposed to mean, this thin little comedy is strictly a wet firecracker" and that "The three stars are marking time, along with the audience, in a slow, dull and predictable tale".

Home media
Double Dynamite was released on DVD on May 13, 2008, both individually and as part of a box set of Sinatra movies.

References

External links
 
 
 
 

1951 films
1951 musical comedy films
1951 romantic comedy films
American musical comedy films
American romantic comedy films
American romantic musical films
American black-and-white films
1950s English-language films
Films directed by Irving Cummings
Films set in California
RKO Pictures films
Films scored by Leigh Harline
1950s American films